Termeil is a small village in the Shoalhaven area of New South Wales, Australia. Termeil is a predominantly rural hamlet at the junction of Bawley Point Road, providing access to the beachside communities of Bawley Point and Kioloa and the Princes Highway. At the  the population was 252. Ulladulla Bus Lines route 741 serves Termeil twice per day on weekdays.

Termeil had a public school from 1885 to 1941 and 1943 to 1955, generally classified as a "public" school, but sometimes as a "provisional" school.

References

Towns in the South Coast (New South Wales)
City of Shoalhaven